Dade may refer to:

 Dade (surname)
 Dade City, Florida
 Miami-Dade County, Florida
 Dade isometry
 Dade's conjecture
Sausage

Historical eras
Dade (1135–1139), era name used by Emperor Chongzong of Western Xia
Dade (1297–1307), era name used by Temür Khan, emperor of the Yuan dynasty

See also 
 Dade County (disambiguation)